Patrick Gillard (born 20 September 1947) is a Belgian field hockey player. He competed in the men's tournament at the 1972 Summer Olympics.

References

External links
 

1947 births
Living people
Belgian male field hockey players
Olympic field hockey players of Belgium
Field hockey players at the 1972 Summer Olympics
Place of birth missing (living people)